Alexander Taylor Rankin House, also known as the Maier-DeWood Residence, is a historic home located in downtown Fort Wayne, Indiana. It was built about 1841, and is a -story, three bay by two bay, Greek Revival style brick dwelling.  A one-story frame addition was erected around 1855.

It was listed on the National Register of Historic Places in 2004.

References

Houses on the National Register of Historic Places in Indiana
Houses completed in 1841
Greek Revival houses in Indiana
National Register of Historic Places in Fort Wayne, Indiana
Houses in Fort Wayne, Indiana